The 926th Engineer Brigade is a combat engineer brigade of the United States Army. Recently transformed from a group sized unit, the 926th returned from a tour in Iraq in late 2008.

Subordinate units 

As of 2018 the following units are subordinated to the 926th Engineer Brigade:

 391st Engineer Battalion, in Greenville, South Carolina
 467th Engineer Battalion, in Millington, Tennessee
 841st Engineer Battalion, in Miami, Florida
 926th Engineer Battalion, in Birmingham, Alabama

Lineage
 Constituted 17 June 1943 in the Army of the United States as the 926th Engineer Aviation Regiment
 Headquarters and Headquarters and Service Company activated 20 June 1943 at Richmond, Virginia (organic elements not organized)
 Inactivated 2 October 1945 at Camp Kilmer, New Jersey
 Headquarters and Headquarters and Service Company, 926th Engineer Aviation Regiment, redesignated 19 December 1946 as Headquarters and Headquarters and Service Company, 926th Engineer Aviation Group
 Activated 31 January 1947 at Wheeler Field, Hawaii
 Inactivated 16 December 1948 at Wheeler Air Force Base, Hawaii
 Allotted 10 March 1949 to the Organized Reserve Corps
 (Organized Reserve Corps redesignated 9 July 1952 as the Army Reserve)
 Activated 7 April 1949 at Montgomery, Alabama
 Reorganized and redesignated 1 October 1951 as Headquarters and Headquarters Company, 926th Engineer Aviation Group
 Reorganized and redesignated 31 January 1957 as Headquarters and Headquarters Company, 926th Engineer Group
 Ordered into active military service 21 November 1990 at Montgomery, Alabama; released from active military service 21 April 1991 and reverted to reserve status
 Ordered into active military service 24 February 2003 at Montgomery, Alabama; released from active military service 22 June 2004 and reverted to reserve status
 Reorganized and redesignated 17 September 2007 as Headquarters and Headquarters Company, 926th Engineer Brigade
 Ordered into active military service 5 March 2008 at Montgomery, Alabama; released from active military service 8 April 2009 and reverted to reserve status

Campaign participation credit
World War II
Normandy
Northern France
Rhineland
Central Europe
Southwest Asia
Defense of Saudi Arabia
Liberation and Defense of Kuwait
War on Terrorism
Campaigns to be determined

Decorations
Meritorious Unit Commendation (Army) for IRAQ 2003–2004
 Meritorious Unit Commendation (Army) for IRAQ 2008–2009

References

External links

The Institute of Heraldry: 926th Engineer Brigade
Engineer Magazine Article

Engineer 926
Military units and formations of the United States Army Reserve
Military units and formations established in 1943